The Hindu Minority and Guardianship Act was established in 1956 as part of the Hindu Code Bills. Three other important acts were also created during this time and they include the Hindu Marriage Act (1955), the Hindu Succession Act (1956), and the Hindu Adoptions and Maintenance Act (1956). All of these acts were put forth under the leadership of Jawaharlal Nehru, and were meant to modernize the then current Hindu legal tradition. The Hindu Minority and Guardianship Act of 1956 was meant to enhance the Guardians and Wards Act of 1890, not serve as its replacement. This act specifically serves to define guardianship relationships between adults and minors, as well as between people of all ages and their respective property.

Introduction

This act is one of four Hindu Code Bills that were codified by the Nehru Administration in 1956.  The other three Acts include the Hindu Succession Act, Hindu Adoptions and Maintenance Act, and Hindu Marriage Act.  The Hindu Minority and Guardianship Act delineates the policies regarding minors according to Indian Hindu personal law.

Important definitions

 A minor is a person under the age of 18
 A guardian is the caretaker of a minor, his or her property, or both.  Categories of guardians include: a natural guardian; a guardian chosen by the mother or father; a guardian appointed by the court; and a person who qualifies as a guardian according to the Court of Wards.

Exception: the state of Jammu and Kashmir.

This Act is intended to be an addendum to the Guardians and Wards Act of 1890, not its replacement.

Overriding quality

Any former law that is inconsistent with this law is declared legally void.  This law supersedes all other relevant laws.

Application

This Act applies to all Hindus, meaning those who belong to the Hindu religion or any of its developmental forms.  These include the Lingayat, Virashiva, and those who follow Brahmo, Prarthana or Arya Samaj.  Those who practice the religions of Buddhism, Sikhism, and Jainism are also considered Hindus.  Finally, those who are not Muslim, Christian, Parsi or Jewish are governed by this Act unless they can prove that prior to its passage, they were not governed by Hindu law.

Both legitimate and illegitimate minors who have at least one parent that meets the stipulations outlined above fall under the jurisdiction of this Act.

Natural guardians
 
The father is the primary guardian for a legitimate boy and unmarried girl and their property, while the mother is the secondary guardian. However, the mother is the ordinarily guardian for all children under the age of five.  For illegitimate children, the mother is the primary guardian, while the father is the secondary guardian.  A married minor girl’s husband becomes her guardian.  For an adoptive son, the adoptive father is the primary guardian, then the adoptive mother.

Each of these, if they chose, may appoint guardians of their child’s person or property.

Should a parent cease being a Hindu or become a renouncer, hermit, or ascetic, that parent will lose his or her guardian rights.

Abilities of natural guardians
 
Natural guardians can take actions that will benefit and protect the minor and his or her property.  However, the guardian cannot sign a personal covenant for the minor.  The guardian cannot sell, mortgage or give away any part of the minor’s immovable property, lease this property for more than five years, or lease the property for more than one year after the child becomes eighteen.

Minors and property

A child cannot act as a guardian of property of minors.

For a minor who possesses an undivided interest in joint family property that is already controlled by an adult in that family, a guardian shall not be appointed to manage that undivided interest.

Welfare of minor
The welfare of the minor will be the primary consideration in the appointment of a guardian.

Notes

http://epgp.inflibnet.ac.in/epgpdata/uploads/epgp_content/women_studies/gender_studies/07._women_and_law/18._womens_right_to_guardianship_and_custody/et/8052_et_et_18.pdf

Indian family law
Hindu law
Nehru administration